Jan Frederik Gronovius (also seen as Johann Frederik and Johannes Fredericus) (10 February 1690 in Leiden – 10 July 1762 in Leiden) was a Dutch botanist notable as a patron of Linnaeus.

John Clayton, a plant collector in Virginia sent him many specimens, as well as manuscript descriptions, in the 1730s. Without Clayton's knowledge, Gronovius used the material in his Flora Virginica (1739–43, 2nd ed. 1762).

He was the son of Jakob Gronovius and grandson of Johann Friedrich Gronovius, both classical scholars. In 1719, he married Margaretha Christina Trigland, who died in 1726, and Johanna Susanna Alensoon in 1729. His son Laurens Theodoor Gronovius (1730–1777) was also a botanist.

References

External links
 Clayton herbarium page with Gronovius picture
 Gronovius genealogy
  J. F. Gronovius: Flora Virginica 1745 on GoogleBooks

1686 births
1762 deaths
18th-century Dutch botanists
People from Leiden